Cordele is a town in Jackson County, Texas, United States. It was founded when land was sold from the New York and Texas Land Company to settlers in 1897. The name is derived from Cordele, Georgia. The first postmaster, Dr. Stapleton, hailed from Cordele, Georgia and named this area to remind him of home. The town was a shipping center at first, even with a post office. There were originally only eight residents. The population reached 176 residents in 1968. The prominent family in the area was the Sbrusch family. Alfonse and Agnes Sbrusch arrived in the area on a mule and a mare. They had six children: Lawrence Sbrusch, Bobby Sbrusch, Thomas Sbrusch, Florine Sbrusch, Alfonse Sbrusch, Linda Sbrusch. The population has declined to 51 in 2000. This town is usually coupled with the town of Edna, 13.2 miles away. Lake Texana is a few miles away, and attracts fisherman from around the state and people looking for recreation on the water or to camp on the water's edge.

References

External links
http://www.tshaonline.org/handbook/online/articles/hnc94
http://www.city-data.com/city/Edna-Cordele-Texas.html

Populated places in Jackson County, Texas